Mundo Mo'y Akin (International title: Deception / ) is a 2013 Philippine television drama series broadcast by GMA Network. Directed by Andoy Ranay, it stars Sunshine Dizon, Angelika Dela Cruz, Alden Richards and Louise delos Reyes. It premiered on March 18, 2013 on the network's Telebabad line up, replacing Pahiram ng Sandali. The series concluded on September 6, 2013 with a total of 122 episodes. It was replaced by Akin Pa Rin ang Bukas in its timeslot.

The series is streaming online on YouTube.

Premise
Best friends Rodora and Perlita have suffered from ridicule for their physical looks. After being not seeing each other, the paths of Perlita and Rodora, now Giselle with a changed face, cross in Giselle's husband's mansion. They both get pregnant at the same time. When Giselle gives birth to an ugly baby, she switched her baby to Perlita's baby in secret.

Cast and characters

Main cast
 Sunshine Dizon as Perlita Mendoza-Smith
 Angelika Dela Cruz as Giselle Atienza-Carbonel / Rodora Santos
 Jolina Magdangal as Zenaida "Aida" Carbonel
 Gabby Eigenmann as Ziggy Carbonel
 Lauren Young as Darlene Atienza Carbonel / Darlene Mendoza Smith
 Jaclyn Jose as Charito Carbonel
 Alden Richards as Jerome Alvarez
 Louise delos Reyes as Marilyn Mendoza / Marilyn Atienza Carbonel
Recurring cast
 Kier Legaspi as Romeo "Romy" Alvarez
 Frances Makil-Ignacio as Josie
 Sef Cadayona as Nonoy Pambide
 Rita De Guzman as Alison Alcantara
 Marc Acueza as Harry Renacia
 Jojit Lorenzo as Andy Santos
 Fabio Ide as George Smith

Development
The series was conceptualized by RJ Nuevas for GMA Entertainment TV and intended for an early 2013 premiere. Nuevas began developing the series mid-2012 under the title Ang Mundo Ko'y Ikaw (lit. You Are My World) and later changed to Mundo Mo'y Akin (lit. Your World is Mine). The project was put on the fast track since the network's supposed line up of primetime series were cancelled/shelved. Denoy Navarro-Punio assigned as head writer while Michele Borja served as the executive producer for the entire run of the show. The network assigned Andoy Ranay to direct the show. Ranay described the series as an "over the top drama and flavored more of a Mexican telenovela."

Production
The principal photography began on February 28, 2013. Majority of the scenes were shot in Hacienda Isabella in Indang, Cavite. Other locations include Tagaytay and Midas Hotel and Casino in Roxas Boulevard, Metro Manila.

Originally slated to air for sixteen weeks, the series was given three weeks extension because of its consistent high ratings and positive feedback.

Casting
The show features eight regular casts: Sunshine Dizon was chosen to play the protagonist, Perlita Mendoza. This series also served as Dizon's comeback project after her four-year hiatus from showbusiness. Dizon described the project as "A very good one that is hard to refuse. The story itself convinced me to accept the job. When they laid down the storyline, I was really moved." Mundo Mo'y Akin is one of the two television dramas she signed-up for the network for the year 2013. Angelika dela Cruz was chosen to play Rodora Santos and Giselle Carbonel. In an interview, Dela Cruz said that at first, she had qualms accepting the role because "she finds it a bit weird and unrealistic for her age to play a mother to a teenage girl." After several discussions with the production people regarding the concept, story line and her character, Dela Cruz finally accepted the role.
	
The series also reunites the tandem of Alden Richards and Louise delos Reyes. The two became household names with the popularity of their characters in One True Love as Tisoy and Elize. Richards and Delos Reyes portray the roles of Jerome Alvarez and Marilyn Mendoza in the series, respectively. The two described their roles as "more mature and more serious than their previous teeny bopper roles." Lauren Young signed on to portray the antagonist Darlene Carbonel. This series served as Young's first project after she transferred and inked an exclusive contract with GMA Network.

The antagonist role, Aida Carbonel was originally offered to Agot Isidro but she turned it down because she found the role "quite similar" to her popular character Leila Samonte in the 2012 hit series, One True Love. The role went to Jolina Magdangal, who says "it's my first time to play antagonist role [...] it's kinda weird but challenging." Gabby Eigenmann signed on to portray the role Ziggy Carbonel. He was also the first actor cast and said "I do not mind it playing another antagonist. There is so much challenge from it. People never get bored of it, including myself." Veteran actress Jaclyn Jose signed on to play the antagonist character Doña Charito Carbonel.

Reception

Ratings
According to AGB Nielsen Philippines' Mega Manila household television ratings, the pilot episode of Mundo Mo'y Akin earned a 22.7% rating. While the final episode scored a 31.6% rating.

Critical response
The series was considered a critical success, positively received by viewers and writers, from its premiere episode. Nestor Torre of Philippine Daily Inquirer said "The series generally made a positive impression on me, due to the confident and believable portrayals of its two leads, Angelika dela Cruz and Sunshine Dizon. And I appreciated the show's penchant for brisk storytelling. Unlike other series that start two generations in the past, this one begins with the two leads already as young adults." Entertainment columnist, Joe Barrameda of Abante described the series as "talk of the town" because of the grand scenes and exciting flow of story. Dinno Erece of the blog Show and Tell praised Jolina Magdangal's performances in the series, said that "I can see her effectiveness as an anti-hero." Abante Tonite's resident entertainment writer, praised the acting performances of Jaclyn Jose, stating that "she is one of the reasons why I watching the show", and described her performance as "effortless". Jojo Gabinete of Abante praised Gabby Eigenmann's powerful acting performances particularly in episode 67, and he is looking forward for another acting nomination and award for Eigenmann. In his review, Isah Red of Manila Standard Today also praised Jaclyn Jose's acting, said that "Jose's bravura performance [in the scene] when she went into hysterics after hearing words from Perlita that Marilyn is Ziggy's daughter; and when she reacted to the DNA test results confirming that Darlene isn't her son's daughter. Wow! Nobody can beat Jose in that department." Red also praised Gabby Eigenmann's performance said that "Eigenmann's reaction [in the scene] when the DNA results confirmed Marilyn is her daughter, he simply held Darlene's hand and cried quietly. The actor showed restraint only the best actors in the industry can do. Though I am no big fan of soap operas, I think with Jose and Eigenmann around, it won't be much of a waste of time to sit and watch and maybe have some tears go by for 45 minutes," he added. On July 4, 2013 edition of his column, Red praised Louise delos Reyes acting performance particularly in the scene where de los Reyes […] visited Perlita (Dizon) in the hospital where she is recovering after a brain surgery, "she started showing very realistic emotions when someone sees a member of a family in that kind of state. She cried real tears even as she was blurting out her feelings for a person she knew as her mother. And that was continuous, without cuts. That's what I call good acting! And De los Reyes didn't mind that theprosthesis applied to her face to make her look "ugly" would even make her features even more horrid than already was."

Accolades

References

External links
 
 

2013 Philippine television series debuts
2013 Philippine television series endings
Filipino-language television shows
GMA Network drama series
Television shows set in the Philippines